The Embassy of Ireland in Paris is the diplomatic mission of Ireland to France. It is located at 12 Avenue Foch in the 16th arrondissement.

The embassy is also represented in France by Honorary Consuls in Cherbourg, Antibes/Cannes,Toulouse and Lyon. The embassy is accredited to Monaco, where it also has an honorary consul.

, the current Ambassador to France is Niall Burgess.

Building
Built in 1892 by architect Ernest Sanson as the Hôtel Particulier, the embassy is located in the historic Hôtel de Breteuil. The building was sold to the Irish Government in 1954 when the lease on the former Embassy on Rue Paul-Valery expired.

In 2006, the reception rooms of the chancery underwent extensive renovations.

See also
Foreign relations of France
Foreign relations of the Republic of Ireland
List of diplomatic missions of Ireland

References

External links
Embassy website

Buildings and structures completed in 1892
Ireland
Buildings and structures in the 16th arrondissement of Paris
Paris
France–Ireland relations